Derrick Sasraku (born 12 April 1994) is a Ghanaian footballer who plays as a centre-forward for Saham Club in Oman.

References

External links
 

1994 births
Living people
Ghanaian footballers
Ghanaian expatriate footballers
Association football forwards
Aduana Stars F.C. players
Club Africain players
Medeama SC players
KF Tirana players
Ghana Premier League players
Kategoria Superiore players
Tunisian Ligue Professionnelle 1 players
Ghanaian expatriate sportspeople in Albania
Ghanaian expatriate sportspeople in Tunisia
Ghanaian expatriate sportspeople in Oman
Ghanaian expatriates in Albania
Ghanaian expatriates in Oman